David Fulton may refer to:

David Fulton (English cricketer) (born 1971), British cricketer
David Fulton (New Zealand cricketer) (born 1983), New Zealand cricketer
David C. Fulton (1838–1899), Wisconsin legislator
David L. Fulton (born 1944), computer scientist, violinist and collector of rare instruments

See also
David Fulton Publishers, a British publishing house